The 2011 United Kingdom elections may refer to one of six elections in the United Kingdom that took place on 5 May 2011:

2011 United Kingdom local elections
2011 Scottish Parliament election
2011 National Assembly for Wales election
2011 Northern Ireland Assembly election
2011 Leicester South by-election
2011 United Kingdom Alternative Vote referendum